Mark Hales (born 7 November 1950) is a British auto racing driver and instructor. He is best known for finishing as runner-up in the 1987 British Touring Car Championship season.

Career 

He was a class B winner in 1987 with his Ford Escort RS Turbo. He switched to the Group N Production Championship in 1988, winning his class in a Ford Sierra in 1989. This led to him being hired for the 1990 BTCC by John McGuire Racing team, running a works backed Mitsubishi Starion. His final season in the BTCC was in 1991. He stayed with Mitsubishi,  and was the sole driver for the works driver. He competed in a Mitsubishi Lancer in the first part of the season, switching to a Mitsubishi Galant for the second part. He got one championship point at Snetterton. He raced in the TVR Tuscan championship in 1993 and 1994, winning the title in both seasons for Team Rallytech. Most recently he has competed in historic racing, winning the Historic Six Hours of Spa in 2004. He was also a contributor and track-tester for the British motorracing magazines Evo and Octane. He also writes for the Daily Telegraph, and has published a book co-written by Nick Mason, called Into The Red.

Racing record

Complete British Saloon / Touring Car Championship results
(key) (Races in bold indicate pole position – 1973–1990 in class) (Races in italics indicate fastest lap – 1 point awarded ?–1989 in class)

‡ Endurance driver.

† Ineligible for points.

Complete European Touring Car Championship results
(key) (Races in bold indicate pole position) (Races in italics indicate fastest lap)

References

External links
 Official site
 

1950 births
Living people
British Touring Car Championship drivers
Porsche Carrera Cup GB drivers